Ocyale lanca, is a species of spider of the genus Ocyale. It is endemic to Sri Lanka.

See also
 List of Lycosidae species

References

Spiders described in 1879
Spiders of Asia
Endemic fauna of Sri Lanka
Lycosidae